Super Typhoon Koryn, known in the Philippines as Typhoon Goring, was the third named storm, first typhoon and super typhoon of the 1993 Pacific typhoon season. A powerful super typhoon, Koryn caused serious damage across the Caroline Islands, the Philippines, and the People's Republic of China, leaving 37 people dead and $14 million (1993 USD). It was the most intense tropical cyclone worldwide in 1993.

Meteorological history

An area of low pressure formed near the Caroline Islands on June 15 and moved northward and then westward where it continued to strengthen and became Tropical Storm Koryn on June 17. Then, Koryn started to move northwestwards.

The rapid intensification occurred within a 23-hour period.

After peaking, the typhoon began to weaken and started making landfall in the northern Philippines. After making landfall in the northern Philippines on June 26, Koryn entered the South China Sea as a Category 2 typhoon. The typhoon maintained the intensity until it made landfall. Moving at 30 km/h, the storm made landfall near Hong Kong and weakened into a strong tropical storm until the storm dissipated on June 29.

Preparations
Officials at the Joint Typhoon Warning Center issued a tropical storm warning for the Caroline Islands as Tropical Depression 6W formed. Reports of evacuations from the Philippines before the storm are unavailable.

Impact
When Koryn passed over Ulithi, an island in the Caroline Islands, it brought  of rain and  winds. There were no reports of fatalities or injuries and minimal roof and crop damage was the only damage. In the Philippines, the storm caused extensive landslides that left 28-51 people dead, injuring 109 others and left $14 million (1993 USD) in damage. The Philippine government declared 16 provinces disaster areas after the storm. In Macau, the storm caused extensive flooding which forced over 600 people to seek shelter. High winds also force a highway bridge to close. Koryn also brought a storm tide of 2–3 meters above normal along the coast of China. Damage in China was severe. In Guangdong, winds of at least tropical storm force and heavy rains damaged crops, destroyed or severely damaged over 378,000 homes and buildings which affected over 5.3 million people. Total damage in China was over 1.2 billion RMB (US$210 million).

See also

List of tropical cyclones
Typhoon Sally (1996)
Typhoon Imbudo
Typhoon Usagi (2013)
Typhoon Hagupit (2008)

References

1993 Pacific typhoon season
Typhoons in China
Typhoon Koryn
Typhoons
Typhoons in Hong Kong
1993 disasters in the Philippines
June 1993 events